Macaranga peltata is a plant found in northern Thailand, Sri Lanka and India. It is one of the most widely occurring early successional woody species in Sri Lanka, specially in low country wet zone. Some of the many common names include kenda - කැන්ද or kanda in Sri Lanka and chandada in India.

Description
Young parts are velvet hairy. The leaf stalk is attached on the lower surface of the leaf, not on the base.

Yellow-green flowers occur in long panicles in leaf axils in the months of January to February. Male flowers are minute, numerous, and clustered in the axils of large bracts. One round, black seed is in a spherical capsule 4 to 5 mm across.

Ecology
Mallotus tetracoccus is a pioneer or early-successional or early-secondary tree species more common in forest edges, clearings, and secondary forests than in mature forest interiors. Ecophysiological studies indicate that Macaranga peltata shows a combination of high quantum use efficiency of photosynthetic system (Fv/Fm) and relative growth rates under higher light conditions, similar in pattern to other pioneer species such as Mallotus tetracoccus.

Uses
Kenda leaves are commonly used for flavoring in Sri Lanka. Halapa dough is often flattened on a kenda leaf to soak in the flavor. Kenda leaves are used to wrap jaggery and other sweetmeats.

Today the major use of Macranga peltata is for making wooden pencils and in the plywood industry. Kollam produces 75 to 100 truck loads of pencil slats.

References

peltata
Flora of the Indian subcontinent
Flora of Indo-China